In algebraic topology, a branch of mathematics, an orientation character on a group  is a group homomorphism
. This notion is of particular significance in surgery theory.

Motivation

This map  is trivial if and only if M is orientable.

The orientation character is an algebraic structure on the fundamental group of a manifold, which captures which loops are orientation reversing and which are orientation preserving.

Twisted group algebra
This is denoted .

Examples
In real projective spaces, the orientation character evaluates trivially on loops if the dimension is odd, and assigns -1 to noncontractible loops in even dimension.

Properties
The orientation character is either trivial or has kernel an index 2 subgroup, which determines the map completely.

See also 
 Whitney characteristic class
 Local system
 Twisted Poincaré duality

External links 
Orientation character at the Manifold Atlas
Geometric topology